Rank comparison chart of non-commissioned officers (NCOs) and enlisted personnel for all armies and land forces of Oceanian states.

Enlisted

See also
 Comparative army enlisted ranks of the Americas
 Ranks and insignia of NATO armies enlisted

References

Military comparisons